Maqun station, is a station of Line 2 and Line S6 of the Nanjing Metro. It started operations on 28 May 2010 along with the rest of Line 2. The theme of this station's decorations is the New Year.

References

Railway stations in Jiangsu
Railway stations in China opened in 2010
Nanjing Metro stations